Anthony Hopkins Davis (c. August 1796 – 4 June 1866) was a businessman and horticulturist in the early days of the Colony of South Australia.

History
Davis was a partner in the firm of Wesley & Davis of London, publisher of religious tracts and such worthy titles as Life of William Grimes, the Runaway Slave and Samuel Wilderspin's Early discipline (both 1832). Business may have been precarious, as in 1837 he and  his wife Mary and four children  were among the earliest emigrants to South Australia, aboard Lord Goderich, arriving in April 1838.

He immediately set about establishing Moore Farm Garden at The Reedbeds (now part of Fulham, Lockleys and Underdale). He did more to advance farming in the infant colony than any other person, with the exception of George Stevenson. For many years, he was one of the most successful exhibitors at the Agricultural and Horticultural shows.

He was a conspicuous critic of Governor Gawler's spending policy, but in the recession attendant on  Governor Grey's stringent financial measures of 1841–1842, he lost a considerable part of his fortune, and abandoned his business interests to concentrate on the farm.

He was elected an alderman on the first Adelaide City Council, which was disbanded in 1843 as unaffordable.

In 1846, he took part in the protests against state-sponsored religion and was one of four secretaries to the Anti - State Aid League, the other three being Chief Justice R. D. Hanson, John Baker and William Bakewell.

He was a member of the Central Roads Board during the fierce agitation against the dray and land taxes in 1849-50, both of which the Government was forced to abandon.

He was appointed Justice of the Peace.

In 1849, he supported representative government, and denounced attempts to establish a peerage, whether life or hereditary. He stood for West Torrens at the first elections for the unicameral South Australian Legislative Council in 1851, but was defeated by Charles Simeon Hare, by a majority of two. He never again stood for public office, but was for some years Chairman of the District Council of West Torrens. His political views then changed remarkably – in 1953 he supported, in letters under the signature of "Vigil", the conservative view of an upper house appointed for life. He expounded these views in the journal Thursday Review he edited in 1859. He frequently aired his views in "Letters to the Editor".  His obituary noted that "... though in his writings he displayed some want of respect for the opinions of others, and although many complained of a bitterness of manner in dealing with political questions and political men, all acknowledged his sincerity, and respected his never-failing moral courage ...  and who, in his various public positions, displayed the qualities of an able man and a good citizen."

He suffered ill-health through the last years of his life and died at Moore Farm, Reedbeds.

Family
Abraham Hopkins Davis (c. August 1796 – 4 June 1866) was married to Mary Davis (c. 1793 – 3 April 1846). Their children who emigrated were:
Mary Ann Davis (ca. 1819 – 29 November 1857) married Henry Stanford ( – 1872? 1881?) of Meadows on 31 October 1844
Emily Davis (c. 1820 – 26 March 1856) married Thomas Stanford ( – 1887?) on 19 January 1848
Frederick Charles Davis (c. 1827 – 23 March 1881) married Nancy Nicholls ( – 1874) on 10 December 1851, settled at Crystal Brook
Alfred Davis ( – c. 8 May 1873) married Ellen Frances Palmer (c. 1834 – 17 March 1862) on 12 June 1856
He married a second time, to Harriet Williams (c. 1803 – 17 September 1866) on 8 May 1848. Her mother died at Moore Farm on 21 May 1849.

References 

1796 births
1866 deaths
Australian horticulturists
19th-century Australian businesspeople